Cazares is a surname originating in Spain. Notable people with the surname include:

Alex Cazares (born 1992), American Voice Actress
Dino Cazares (born 1966), American musician
Gabe Cazares (1920–2006), American mayor
Hugo Cázares (born 1978), Mexican boxer
Juan Cazares (born 1992), Ecuadorian footballer

Surnames of Spanish origin